John Alexander Floersh (October 5, 1886 – June 11, 1968) was an American bishop of the Roman Catholic Church. Becoming Bishop of Louisville in 1924, he was elevated to the rank of archbishop in 1937 and served until his retirement in 1967.

Early life and priesthood
John Floersh was born in Nashville, Tennessee, the fourth of eight children of John and Minnie (née Alexander) Floersh. His father was a cigar manufacturer. He began his studies for the priesthood at age sixteen, and earned his Doctor of Philosophy (1907) and Doctor of Divinity (1911) degrees from the Propaganda College in Rome.

He was ordained a priest in Rome on June 10, 1911. Returning to the United States, he did pastoral work in the Diocese of Nashville for a year before becoming secretary to Archbishop Giovanni Bonzano, the Apostolic Delegate in Washington, D.C. He was named a Monsignor by Pope Benedict XV in 1917.

Episcopal ministry
On February 6, 1923, Floersh was appointed coadjutor bishop of the Diocese of Louisville, Kentucky, and titular bishop of Lycopolis by Pope Pius XI. He received his episcopal consecration on the following April 8 from Archbishop Bonzano, with Archbishop Francesco Marchetti Selvaggiani and Bishop Michele Cerrati serving as co-consecrators. Following the retirement of Bishop Denis O'Donaghue, Floersh succeeded him as Bishop of Louisville on July 26, 1924. When the Diocese of Louisville was elevated to the rank of an archdiocese on December 10, 1937, Floersh became its first Archbishop.

During his tenure, he greatly increased the number of parishes, schools, and other institutions. He established Bellarmine University, Catholic Charities, annual Corpus Christi processions, and St. Thomas Seminary (which was open from 1952 to 1970). In 1941, he criticized The Courier-Journal for featuring a full-page advertisement for birth control. He also called on Kentucky Catholics to support the civil rights movement. Between 1962 and 1965, he attended all four sessions of the Second Vatican Council, where he was the 21st ranking bishop.

Later life
After forty-three years as head of the Diocese of Louisville, Floersh resigned on March 1, 1967, after Pope Paul VI called for the voluntary retirement of resident bishops older than 75. He died just over a year later, on June 11, 1968, at age 81. He is buried in Calvary Cemetery.

References

1886 births
1968 deaths
Participants in the Second Vatican Council
Roman Catholic Archdiocese of Louisville
20th-century Roman Catholic archbishops in the United States
Religious leaders from Kentucky